Highfalls is an unincorporated community in Geneva County, Alabama, United States.

History
A post office operated under the name Highfalls from 1874 to 1899.

References

Unincorporated communities in Geneva County, Alabama
Unincorporated communities in Alabama